Zakraj is a settlement south of Šentviška Gora in the Municipality of Tolmin in the Littoral region of Slovenia. It includes the hamlet of Kos.

References

External links

Zakraj on Geopedia

Populated places in the Municipality of Tolmin